Lobodice is a municipality and village in Přerov District in the Olomouc Region of the Czech Republic. It has about 700 inhabitants.

Administrative parts
Villages of Chrbov and Cvrčov are administrative parts of Lobodice.

History
The first written mention of Lobodice is in a deed of Bishop Jindřich Zdík from 1141.

References

Villages in Přerov District